The 2015 African U-20 Championship was the 20th edition of the biennial international youth football tournament organized by the Confederation of African Football (CAF) for players aged 20 and below. The tournament took place in Senegal between 8–22 March 2015.

The semi-finalists of the tournament qualified for the 2015 FIFA U-20 World Cup in New Zealand. Nigeria won the tournament, and were joined by hosts Senegal, Ghana, and Mali as CAF qualifiers for the 2015 FIFA U-20 World Cup.

Qualification

The qualifiers were played between April and August 2014. At the end of the qualification phase, seven teams joined the hosts Senegal.

Qualified teams
 
 
 
 
 
  (hosts)

Venues

Match officials
The referees were:

Referees

 Joshua Bondo
 Juste Ephrem Zio
 Thierry Nkurunziza
 Aurélien Juenkou Wandji
 Ibrahim Nour El Din
 Bienvenu Sinko
 Davies Ogenche Omweno
 Mohamed Ragab Omar
 Mahamadou Keita
 Rédouane Jiyed
 Daouda Gueye
 Hagi Yabarow Wiish
 Mutaz Abdelbasit Khairalla

Assistant referees

 Mokrane Gourari
 Elvis Guy Noupue Nguegoue
 Issa Yaya
 Olivier Safari Kabene
 Berhe O'Michael
 Kindie Mussie
 David Laryea
 Sidiki Sidibe
 Abderahmane Warr
 Abel Baba
 Ababacar Sene
 Hensley Danny Petrousse
 Mothibidi Stevens Khumalo
 Faouzi Jridi
 Mark Ssonko

Draw
The draw for the final tournament was held on 21 December 2014, 11:00 UTC+02:00, at the CAF Headquarters in Cairo, Egypt. Senegal and Ghana were seeded and placed into Groups A and B respectively.

Squads

Each team could register a squad of 21 players (three of whom had to be goalkeepers).

Group stage
The group winners and runners-up advanced to the semi-finals and qualified for the 2015 FIFA U-20 World Cup.

Tiebreakers
The teams were ranked according to points (3 points for a win, 1 point for a draw, 0 points for a loss). If tied on points, tiebreakers were applied in the following order:
Number of points obtained in games between the teams concerned;
Goal difference in games between the teams concerned;
Goals scored in games between the teams concerned;
Goal difference in all games;
Goals scored in all games;
Fair Play point system in which the number of yellow and red cards were evaluated;
Drawing of lots.

All times are UTC±00:00.

Group A

Group B

Knockout stage
In the knockout stage, if a match was level at the end of normal playing time, extra time was played (two periods of 15 minutes each) and followed, if necessary, by a penalty shoot-out to determine the winner, except for the play-off for third place where no extra time was played.

Semi-finals

Third place match

Final

Awards
Fair play trophy: Nigeria                                
Orange Man of the tournament:  Yaw Yeboah
Best goal of the tournament:  Bernard Bulbwa against Senegal in the final

Team of the tournament 

Starting Eleven
 Enaholo Joshua
 Musa Muhammed
 Souleymane Diarra
 Mouhameth Sané
 Sidy Sarr
 Alassane Diallo
 Ibrahima Wadji
 Yaw Yeboah
 Idowu Elijah
 Clifford Aboagye
 Taiwo Awoniyi

Substitutes
 Sory Ibrahim Traore
 Joseph Aidoo 
 Ifeanyi Matthew 
 Omego Prince 
 Tyroane Joe Sandows
 Silvere Ganvoula Mboussy
 Malick Toure 
 Prosper Kassim

Goalscorers
4 goals
 Musa Muhammed

3 goals

 Silvère Ganvoula
 Taiwo Awoniyi
 Sidy Sarr
 Ibrahima Wadji
 Tyroane Sandows

2 goals

 Chris Bedia
 Yaw Yeboah
 Alassane Diallo
 Hamidou Traoré
 Ifeanyi Matthew
 Dumisani Zuma
 Moussa Koné

1 goal

 Constantin Bakaki
 Moise Nkounkou
 Clifford Aboagye
 Samuel Afful
 Asiedu Attobrah
 Benjamin Tetteh
 Victorien Angban
 Yakou Meite
 Dogbole Niangbo
 Ichaka Diarra
 Malick Touré
 Bernard Bulbwa
 Obinna Nwobodo
 Christian Pyagbara
 El Hadji Malick Niang
 Motjeka Madisha
 Dave Daka
 Charles Zulu

Own goal
 Thamsanqa Masiya (against Ghana)
 Kabelo Seriba (against Zambia)

See also
2015 African U-17 Championship

References

External links
19th Edition of the African Under 20 Championship, CAFonline.com

 
2015
U-20 Championship
International association football competitions hosted by Senegal
2015 in youth association football
Foo